Hispanic and Latino American Muslims are Hispanic and Latino Americans who are of the Islamic faith. Hispanic and Latino Americans are an ethnolinguistic group of citizens of the United States with origins in Spain and Latin America. Islam is an Abrahamic, monotheistic religion teaching that there is only one God (Allah), and that Muhammad is a messenger of God. The primary scriptures of Islam are the Quran, claimed to be the verbatim word of God, and the teachings and normative examples (called the sunnah, composed of accounts called hadith) of Muhammad. Muslims believe that Islam is the complete and universal version of a primordial faith that was revealed many times before through prophets including Adam, Abraham, Moses and Jesus, and the Quran in its Arabic to be the unaltered and final revelation of God. The Spaniards took the Roman Catholic faith to Latin America via imperialism and colonialism; Roman Catholicism continues to be the largest, but not the only, religious denomination among most Hispanics. In contrast, the Arabs took Islam to very few Latin American countries such as Mexico, El Salvador, Guatemala and Colombia via post-independence immigration.

Reasons for conversion

Some Latinos have argued that Islamic values harmonize with the traditional values of Latino culture. Converts have cited such similarities as respect for social solidarity, the family, the importance of religion, and education. Islam includes acceptance of tawhid (monotheism), and a belief that Muhammad is a messenger of God. This is the basis of the shahada, or declaration of faith.

Many Latino converts come from Catholic backgrounds and the similarities between Catholicism and Islam give them a sense of familiarity with their new religion. However, some Latino Muslims had difficulty with the Church, believing in original sin, and in the Holy Trinity. Islam solves the problems many Latinos have with the Catholic Church. Fathi Osman, resident scholar at the Omar Foundation, says "in their own countries Hispanics did not see the Church supporting the rights of the poor.  Rather it sided with the rich and the influential."  This, he argues, has contributed to some Latinos converting to Islam.

In addition, Islam often draws in converts because of the nature of the religion is that a person has a direct relationship with God. One does not need a mediator, like a priest in Catholicism. There is a relative simplicity within Islam with structure and theology in this respect.

Some Latino Muslims claim conversion to Islam as a return to their true heritage. Muslim Moors invaded Spain in 711 and their last stronghold fell in 1492. The process of conversion is instead often referred to as "reversion" due to it being the rediscovery and connection with a lost heritage and tie to Islam.

Islam began to have a more significant influence on the Latino community in the barrios in the Northeast in the early 70s through converts being introduced to the religion in African-American mosques. Others made the connection through others who were affiliated with the Nation of Islam and found solidarity with their understanding of racial struggle.

Other reasons for conversion include finding resonance with Islam after researching other religions, or having an academic interest in Islam that leads to a spiritual interest. Others also choose to convert because they are dating or married to someone who is Muslim.

Liberation theology 
The concept of liberation theology has Christian roots in the Latin American struggle for social justice in light of colonialism and oppression, but the term has also been applied in an Islamic context. Islamic liberation theology emerged from the struggle against "settler colonialism and apartheid in South Africa." According to Palombo, “[a]ll liberation theologies emerge during struggles for socioeconomic, political, and psychological liberation from objective and subjective forms of oppression,” and “the revelatory activity of God in history demonstrates a 'preferential option for the poor' and sides against those who exert oppression and domination.”

Islam is seen as "refusing" the concept of separation of religion and politics of the Enlightenment, which in turn leads to the necessity for social and political activism, much like the Muslim activists of the 20th century that challenged colonialism and corruption of the government. In addition, the Qur'an tells the stories of the prophets and their "belief (iman) in God and the struggle (jihad) for social justice," which further motivates Muslims to follow the example of the prophets and engage in social activism.

Similar to the struggle of African Americans, Latino Muslims can find solidarity and a similar theological understanding of struggle and oppression through Islam. Islamic liberation theology is similar to Christian liberation theology in many ways, but the break from Christianity, and Catholicism in particular, allows many Latino Muslims to disassociate from their historical oppressors in the Americas.

Conversion to Islam in prisons 
Although there are inconsistent exact numbers of conversions, many scholars and chaplains cite Islam as the fastest growing religion among the incarcerated population. It is estimated that 15% of the U.S. prison population is Muslim, mostly composed of African Americans but followed by Latinos. In 1991 an estimated 35,000 people in prison converted to Islam every year, and more recent estimates range from 30,000–40,000 per year. With the growth of the imprisoned population with mass incarceration and the growth of Islam in the U.S., these numbers are bound to be under-representing the Muslim convert population in prison.

Islam allows those convicted of crimes to recover from the stigma of being a "criminal". By following the teachings of Islam, people who are convicted of a crime have a moral framework for rehabilitation and recovery as well as providing prisoners with a more positive way to cope with the harsh environment in prison, which in turn lessens their likelihood to have to turn to violence and aggression. Spalek and El-Hassan suggest that the work of prison Imams is vital and needs to have greater support, especially during the transition period when individuals and adjusting to life after being released from prison. Studies also show that rates of recidivism are lower for Muslim converts.

Despite the benefits for Muslim converts in terms of rehabilitation, some authors describe concerns about the threat of radicalization within prisons. Black nationalist sentiments have a legacy within many U.S. prisons, but less so Wahhabism or other types of radical Islamism.

Statistics and demographics
The terms Latino and Hispanic denote an ethnicity, not a race. Many Latino Muslims live in various cities within the United States and have shown a growing presence in states like New York, Illinois, New Jersey and Florida. The Latino Muslim community is estimated to be between 40,000 and 200,000.

In 2002 the Islamic Society of North America stated that there were 40,000 Hispanic Muslims in the United States. The population of Hispanic Muslims has increased 30 percent to some 200,000 since 1999, estimates Ali Khan, national director of the American Muslim Council in Chicago.

Since the United States Census Bureau does not provide statistics on religion, statistics are scarce and wide-ranging. A 2011 study conducted by the Pew Research Center showed that Latino Muslims accounted for an estimated 6 percent out of the Muslims living in the U.S. In 2015, the Pew Research Center estimated that there were about 3.3 million Muslims in the U.S. A previous Pew Research study of Muslim Americans in 2007 estimated that 10% of native-born Muslims in the U.S. are Hispanic. A more recent Pew Research study on Latinos and Religion found that less than 0.5% of Latinos identify as Muslim, which would be around 265,000 people.

The majority of Hispanic converts to Islam are women. Hispanic and Latino Muslims also include people with Middle Eastern descent from Latin America.

Latino Muslim Survey (LMS) 
In 2017, the Latino Muslim Survey — an online, English/Spanish survey with more than 560 U.S. Latino Muslim participants — released its results.

Key findings include:
 Findings determined that many converts were attracted to the devotion of Islamic beliefs and practices.
 The survey found that 93% stated that religion provides meaningful guidance in their day-to-day living.
 The vast majority of Latino Muslims surveyed (91%) self-identify as Sunni Muslims.
 The majority of respondents said they first heard about Islam from a friend (40%), while 13% were introduced by a spouse, and 8% by a family member.
 34% of participants described their decision to embrace Islam as a "conversion," 40% saw it as a "reversion."

Racial and ethnic ties to Islam 
Islam draws to Hispanic and Latino individuals because many people feel that it allows them to reclaim their historical ties to "a glorious past" of the Islamic world. Many Latinos feel a connection with Spain's eight centuries of influence of Islam through the Moors. For example, the Spanish language has remnants of Arabic influence in thousands of words such as "Ojalá" (may God will)." Moreover, many Latinos are descended from Muslim West African slaves who were imported to Latin America during the 16th, 17th, and 18th centuries, as well as Muslim Arabs from the Levant who immigrated to Latin America during the 19th and 20th centuries.

There is not a lot of information about Hispanic and Latino Muslims from the colonial period up to the 19th century. Most of what we know about the Latino Muslim population came from the latter half of the 20th century when more Hispanics and Latinos living in the United States began to reestablish and reconnect with their ties to Spanish-speakers in the Americas, particularly in regards to culture, ethnicity, and religion. Meanwhile, a similar reclaiming of ties was occurring among African-Americans, especially with the founding of the Nation of Islam.

Islam in the United States has a unique context of shared self-discovery of historically marginalized groups like African Americans and Latinos, which make up a large proportion of the Muslim population in the U.S., along with Middle Eastern, African, South Asian, and Southeast Asian immigrant Muslim communities. As a result of the multicultural Islamic community and the concept of ummah, the term "Raza Islámica" is used to refer to "the vision of the Prophet Muhammad—a society in which Islam, not tribe, color, nor clan, is the mark of one's identity."

As the African American Sunni community grows, the gap between African American and immigrant Muslim communities is narrowing, meaning that Latino Muslims can more easily connect with both groups. Latino Muslims can share in the fight for social justice and against institutional racism with African Americans, and can empathize with immigrant Muslims through the experience of having a racially fluid cultural identity.

However, like African American converts, Latino Muslims have experienced some tension with the growing immigrant Muslim community in the U.S. who "deem them inauthentic because they either lack Arabic language skills or they do not adhere to certain religious practices." In an effort to connect and integrate themselves with the Muslim community, many Latino converts will choose an Islamic name to go by. Often converts will use this second name in Muslim settings and their given name in the context of family and the Latino community.

As a result, Latino ties to Islam largely resulted from African American links. For example, the Five Percent Nation had some success recruiting African American and Latino youth through hip hop music. More than ten years ago Puerto Rican converts within the Five Percent Nation translated a version of the 120 Lessons to Spanish to accommodate the growing Spanish-speaking Muslim community.

Organization in the United States
For many Latino Muslims, converting to Islam was an easy process because of the overall similarities between their new and old religions. Despite all of these similarities, most converts may experience rejection and criticism from their Latino families and friends. Like other Muslims, Latinos who practice Islam may face a barrage of harassment and death threats.

Latino Muslim communities have created support systems, both physically and virtually, through the presence of small mosques and online sites that provide support systems for Latino Muslims, including www.HispanicMuslims.com, www.Latinodawah.org, and www.Piedad.info.

In 1982 a group of Mexican Muslims established the Association of Latin American Muslims, based in D.C.

In 1987 Alianza Islámica was established after a group of Latino Muslims in New York felt that their "particular culture, languages, social situations, and contributions to Islamic history" were not well addressed in the African-American or immigrant Muslim communities.

In 1988 PIEDAD was founded in New York by Khadijah Rivera. Literally, PIEDAD means “Taqwa, piety or God-fearing.” In its acronym form it reads “Propagación Islámica para la Educación y la Devoción a Aláh el Divino” (Islamic dawah to educate and worship Allah the Most High). Their numerous seminars have included speakers like Imam Siraj Wahhaj, Mohammed Nasim, Dr. Thomas Irving, Dr. Omar Kasule, and others. PIEDAD began as dawah directed to the overlooked Hispanic women in NYC.

In 1997 the Latino American Da'wah Organization (LADO) was founded by Samantha Sanchez, along with Juan Alvarado and Saraji Umm Zaid, with a mission to promote Islam within the Latino community and to make information available in Spanish, Portuguese, and English. Juan Galvan is its current president. It is now one of the most well-known Latino Muslim groups, working with other organizations inside and outside the United States, including Islamic Society of North America.

In 1999 a group of Latino Muslims led Marta Felicitas Galedary by from Los Angeles began a study group to learn about Islam in the Spanish language. Because of much interest, they formed LALMA, which is the acronym for Los Angeles Latino Muslims Association. Their mission statement states that "LALMA is an organization of Latino Muslims that promotes a better understanding of Islam to the Spanish speaking community and establishes a forum of spiritual nurturing and social support to Latino Muslims, building bridges among the monotheistic community and advocating for social justice in accordance with Islamic values." LALMA now stands for La Asociacion Latino Musulmana de America and is still based in the Los Angeles area.

In 2001 IslamInSpanish began providing multi media material in the Spanish language and conduct (sermons) in Spanish at two locations in the Houston area. The weekly sessions are broadcast online to the worldwide Spanish-speaking Muslim population. In 2016, IslamInSpanish opened up the first Spanish-speaking Islamic Center in the United States. They also hosted the first National Latino Muslim Convention in conjunction with the Texas Dawah Convention in 2016.

There is also CAIR in Español and MAS in Español.

Hispanic Muslim communities have grown across the United States, including in Massachusetts, Michigan, New York, Texas, New Jersey, Illinois, Florida, Arizona, and California.

With the common rhetoric of Islamophobia in the U.S. media, Hispanic Muslims are also concerned about the representation of Islam in broader society, especially in Spanish language outlets. Wilfredo Amr Ruiz is an attorney and Muslim chaplain, originally from Puerto Rico, who is often asked to address and contextualize current events with connections to Islam by both English and Spanish-language media in the U.S. There is also a 2009 documentary film New Muslim Cool that follows the life of Hamza Perez, a Puerto Rican Muslim rap artist, that helps to counter Islamophobia rhetoric.

Questions for further inquiry
According to Abbas Barzegar, "Future research aimed at understanding the significance of the rising role of Islam among Latinos in the United States needs to be placed along a comprehensive matrix that allows for the simultaneous analysis of a number of variables.  Some of the factors that need attention include the religious tone of the Latino community, the role of Latinos in the United States, the location of Islam in American civic life, the relationships between immigrant Muslim communities and Latinos, and a host of other concerns."

Notable Latino Muslims 

The conversion stories of some notable Latino Muslims listed here can be found in the book Latino Muslims: Our Journeys to Islam. Juan Galvan is its editor as well as a contributor.

Cristian Gonzáles
Daniel Maldonado
Enrique Marquez
Hamza Perez
Jaime Fletcher
Julio Pino
Juan Carlos Gómez
Khadijah Rivera
Marta Felicitas Galedary
Armando Bukele Kattán

See also

 Alianza Islámica
 African-American Muslims
 Latino Americans
 Islam in the United States
 Latin American Muslims
 Latino American Dawah Organization
 LALMA
 PIEDAD
 IslamInSpanish

References

Further reading
Articles on Latino Muslims
The LADO Newsletter
Four Muslim Latinas open up about their journeys to Islam 
'It's beautiful': How four Los Angeles Latinos found peace in Islam
Five Years Since the Release of ‘New Muslim Cool’: Hispanic Muslims Growing Segment of U.S. Muslim Religious Culture

External links
Latino American Dawah Organization
La Asociación Latino Musulmana de América
HispanicMuslims.com
IslamInSpanish
HablamosIslam
PIEDAD

Islam in the United States
American Muslims
Islam